Elisabeth Salom Pons (born 20 January 1989) is a Spanish group rhythmic gymnast. She represents her nation at international competitions. 

She participated at the 2008 Summer Olympics in Beijing. She also competed at world championships, including at the 2007  World Rhythmic Gymnastics Championships.

Notes

References

External links
 
 
 
 
 
 Seleccion Española de gimnasia ritmica Conjunto Pekin 2008
 sportcentric.com 

1989 births
Living people
Spanish rhythmic gymnasts
Olympic gymnasts of Spain
Gymnasts at the 2008 Summer Olympics
Place of birth missing (living people)
21st-century Spanish women